Baghdad College of Economic Sciences University is a private Iraqi university established in 1996 in Baghdad, Iraq.

See also 

 Private Universities in Iraq

External links 
 Baghdad College of Economic Sciences University

Universities in Iraq
Education in Baghdad
Educational institutions established in 1996
1996 establishments in Iraq